Mario Celon (born: 29 August 1959 Verona) is a sailor from Italy, who represented his country at the 1996 Summer Olympics in Savannah, United States as helmsman in the Soling. With crew members Gianni Torboli and Claudio Celon they took the 10th place.

References

1959 births
Living people
Sailors at the 1984 Summer Olympics – Flying Dutchman
Sailors at the 1988 Summer Olympics – Flying Dutchman
Sailors at the 1996 Summer Olympics – Soling
Olympic sailors of Italy
Sportspeople from Verona
Italian male sailors (sport)